Francesca Zino (born 11 February 1975) is a British rower. She competed in the women's eight event at the 2000 Summer Olympics.

References

External links
 

1975 births
Living people
British female rowers
Olympic rowers of Great Britain
Rowers at the 2000 Summer Olympics
Rowers from Greater London